Helen Glacier Tongue is a glacier tongue which extends seaward from Helen Glacier on the coast of Antarctica. It was discovered in November 1912 by the Western Base Party of the Australasian Antarctic Expedition under Mawson, and is named after Helen Glacier.

References

See also
Wright Bay

Ice tongues of Antarctica
Bodies of ice of Queen Mary Land